Reinfeld may refer to:

Reinfeld, Schleswig-Holstein, a town in Schleswig-Holstein, Germany
Reinfeld, Manitoba, a town in Canada
Reinfeld, a small village near Templin, Brandenburg, Germany
Fred Reinfeld, American chess player and writer

See also
Fredrik Reinfeldt, Prime Minister of Sweden